Alto Pativilca–Alto Marañón–Alto Huallaga Quechua (abbreviated AP–AM–AH) is a dialect cluster of Quechua languages spoken in the Peruvian provinces of Huánuco, Lauricocha, Cajatambo and neighboring areas. The best-known dialect within the Huánuco cluster is Huallaga Quechua.

References

Sources
 Adelaar, Willem. The Languages of the Andes. With the collaboration of P.C. Muysken. Cambridge language survey. Cambridge University Press, 2007, 

Languages of Peru
Quechuan languages